The 2013 Ukrainian Football Amateur League season.

Teams
 Debut: FC Bukovyna-2-LS Chernivtsi, FC Rukh Vynnyky, FC Vinnytsia, FC Burevisnyk Petrove, FC Zorya Biloziria, FC Avanhard Koryukivka, LKT-Slavutych, YSB Chernihiv, FC Barsa Sumy, USC-Rubin Donetsk, FC Enerhiya Mykolaiv, FC Kolos Khlibodarivka
 Newly admitted former professional clubs: FC Ternopil, FC Obolon-Brovar Kyiv, FC Bastion Illichivsk
 Returning clubs: FC Zbruch Volochysk, FC Avanhard Novohrad-Volynskyi

Withdrawn
List of clubs that took part in last year competition, but chose not to participate in 2013 season.
 FC Karpaty Kolomyia
 FC Lehion Zhytomyr
 FC Volodarka
 FC Olimpik Kirovohrad
 FC Arsenal Kharkiv
 FC Sovinyon Tayirove
 FC Tarutyne
 FC Foros

Locations

First stage

Group 1

Group 2

Group 3

Group 4

Finals

Group A

Group B

Championship match

References
 Season results from AAFU 2013

Ukrainian Football Amateur League seasons
Amateur
Amateur